Four Japanese destroyers have been named :

 , a  that entered into service of the Japanese Maritime Self-Defense Force in 1999

Imperial Japanese Navy ship names
Japan Maritime Self-Defense Force ship names
Japanese Navy ship names